Westmorland and Furness is a future unitary authority area in north-west England, which (along with Cumberland) will come into being on 1 April 2023 on the abolition of Cumbria County Council. The council will cover the areas currently served by the districts of Barrow-in-Furness, Eden and South Lakeland, which will also cease to function. It will include all of the area of the historic county of Westmorland as well as the Furness district of historic Lancashire. It will also incorporate a very small part of historic Yorkshire together with about a quarter of the area of the historic county of Cumberland. 

The district will sit within the ceremonial county of Cumbria, which will no longer have any administrative function.

The first elections to the new authority took place in May 2022, with the Westmorland and Furness Council acting as a 'shadow authority' until the abolition of the three former districts and Cumbria County Council on 1 April 2023.

Background
Elections to Cumbria County Council were due to take place in May 2021; however they were postponed for one year by the Secretary of State for Housing, Communities and Local Government due to a consultation on local government reorganisation in the area. In July 2021, the government announced that the current authorities in Cumbria would be abolished and replaced with two unitary authorities, with an east/west split of the county.

Opponents of the reorganisation claimed that the proposal was being pursued to benefit the electoral prospects of the Conservative Party. Cumbria County Council, which would be abolished under the plans, sought judicial review to prevent the reorganisation from taking place. The judicial review was refused by the High Court in January 2022. Draft statutory instruments to bring about local government reorganisation in Cumbria were subsequently laid before parliament. The Cumbria (Structural Changes) Order 2022 (2022 No. 331) was made on 17 March 2022 and came into force the following day.

Area
The name of the unitary authority derives from the county of Westmorland and the peninsula of Furness. Westmorland was previously an administrative county until it was abolished by the Local Government Act 1972 and became part of the new county of Cumbria. Furness was administered as part of Lancashire until 1974; together with the Cartmel Peninsula it formed an exclave of that county historically known as North Lonsdale. In addition to those areas, the district includes part of the historic county of Cumberland in the Penrith area, and an area centred on Sedbergh which was part of the West Riding of Yorkshire.

Westmorland and Furness, together with neighbouring Cumberland, will continue to constitute a ceremonial county named "Cumbria" for the purpose of lieutenancy and shrievalties, being presided over by a Lord Lieutenant of Cumbria and a High Sheriff of Cumbria. Ceremonial counties do not discharge any administrative function. Police services will continue to be provided by Cumbria Constabulary overseen by the Cumbria Police and Crime Commissioner.

Politics
Westmorland and Furness Council will have 65 councillors, and the first election to the local authority was in May 2022. At that election the Liberal Democrats secured a majority on the incoming council with 36 out of 65 councillors. Labour will have 15 councillors, the Conservatives will have 11 councillors, the Green Party will have 1 councillor and 2 councillors were elected as independents.

See also

2019–2023 structural changes to local government in England

References

External links
Westmorland and Furness Shadow Authority
Westmorland and Furness Joint Committee
Two New Councils for Cumbria

Local government in Cumbria
Local government districts of Cumbria
Unitary authority districts of England
Organizations established in 2023
2023 establishments in England